Slo Pitch is a Canadian web television comedy series, co-created by J. Stevens, Gwenlyn Cumyn, and Karen Knox. The series centres on the Brovaries, an underachieving softball team for LGBTQ women and non-binary players; despite being perennial losers who are mostly more concerned with drinking beer and meeting women at after-game parties than they are with the sport, they unexpectedly find themselves in the league championships playing against their arch-rival Toronto Blue Gays. 

Slo Pitch features a fully female and/or non-binary led creative team, a key cast that is 50 percent BIPOC, 70% of the cast and crew identifying as female or non-binary, and 80% of key cast identifying as LGBTQ+. The cast includes Kirsten Rasmussen, Gwenlyn Cumyn, Karen Knox, Lane Webber, K Alexander, Khadijah Roberts-Abdullah, Amanda Cordner, Aisha Evelyna, and Chelsea Muirhead.

It premiered August 3, 2020 on OUTtvgo in Canada, and aired on OutTV's linear television channel in 2021. Slo Pitch was picked up by IFC (U.S. TV channel) and aired on their platform October 18, 2021. 

The series was produced by Shaftesbury Films (Paige Haight) and Boss & Co (Michael Schram, Cumyn, and Knox). with funding from the Independent Production Fund and the Bell Fund.

Co-writers Knox and Cumyn met 12 years ago at George Brown Theatre School where they started collaborating on plays.

The show’s theme song is called "Play the Field", by Partner.

Plot

Season 1 
The show follows a queer female softball team trying to make it to the championships of their competitive beer league in Toronto, Canada. The mockumentary focuses on an overly invested coach named Joanne, played by Kirsten Rasmussen, and her attempts to take her underdog team The Brovaries all the way to championships. Co-creator J Stevens says they got the idea for the show after playing many team sports, and witnessing the amount of drama that comes from the players.

Characters 

 Joanne (played by Kirsten Rasmussen) is the arguably too devoted coach of the Brovaries She's engaged to her longtime girlfriend Sasha, and works as a data analyst. 
 Sasha (played by Chelsea Muirhead) is Joanne’s fiance. She is a successful lawyer.
 Boris (played by Karen Knox) is a German immigrant to Canada, and the second best player on the team.
 Ann (played by Gwenlyn Cumyn) plays second base on the Brovaries. She lives in Joanne and Sasha’s basement, and is carrying on an affair with two members of their rival team, The Toronto Blue Gays. 
 Lee (played by Lane Webber) is the resident “mischievous” rookie for the Brovaries.
 Mel (played by Amanda Cordner) is the so-called MVP of the Brovaries. A former pro-player, Mel has returned to Toronto and given up her professional softball career. 
 Zari (played by Khadijah Roberts-Abdullah) is the only heterosexual member of the Brovaries. In the first season, she tries to “set Boris up with her friend, which turns out to be a huge mess, but she uses a peanut allergy as a means to discuss cultural appropriation.”

Awards 
The series was nominated for the LGBTQ+ Spirit Award at the 2020 TOWebfest.

References

2020 Canadian television series debuts
2020s Canadian LGBT-related comedy television series
Canadian comedy web series
Canadian LGBT-related web series
2020 web series debuts
OutTV (Canadian TV channel) original programming
Television series by Shaftesbury Films